Bridge in Washington Township, also known as Kralltown Road Bridge, was a double-intersection Pratt truss bridge spanning Bermudian Creek near Kralltown, Washington Township, York County, Pennsylvania. The bridge was built in 1884 by the Wrought Iron Bridge Company and measured  in overall length.

It was added to the National Register of Historic Places in 1988. The historic wrought iron truss has since been replaced with a two-span prestressed concrete box girder bridge.

See also
List of bridges documented by the Historic American Engineering Record in Pennsylvania

References

External links

Road bridges on the National Register of Historic Places in Pennsylvania
Bridges completed in 1884
Bridges in York County, Pennsylvania
Historic American Engineering Record in Pennsylvania
National Register of Historic Places in York County, Pennsylvania
1884 establishments in Pennsylvania
Wrought iron bridges in the United States
Pratt truss bridges in the United States